The Ottawa Catholic School Board (OCSB, known as English-language Separate District School Board No. 53 prior to 1999) is a publicly funded separate school board in Ottawa, Ontario, Canada. Its headquarters are in the Nepean area of Ottawa.

It employs approximately 4,777 people (Full-time equivalents) and operates 84 schools in the greater Ottawa area, with a total student population of approximately 44,200. Before 2007, the board was known as Ottawa-Carleton Catholic School Board (OCCSB) and its two former boards prior to 1998, Carleton Roman Catholic Separate School Board (CRCSSB) and  Ottawa Roman Catholic Separate School Board (ORCSSB).

History
Merging of the former Ottawa and former Carleton Roman Catholic School Boards resulted in the establishment of the Ottawa-Carleton Catholic School Board on January 1, 1998. The board changed its name to the Ottawa Catholic School Board on March 27, 2007, to emphasize the commitment to Catholicity and to reflect the amalgamation of the City of Ottawa.

See also

List of schools of the Ottawa Catholic School Board
Ottawa-Carleton District School Board
List of school districts in Ontario
List of high schools in Ontario

Further reading
"150 Years of Catholic Education in Ottawa-Carleton 1856-2006." (Archive)

References

External links
OCSB website
OCSB School Zone map

Catholic School Board
Roman Catholic school districts in Ontario